is a railway station on the Chikuhō Main Line operated by JR Kyushu in Iizuka, Fukuoka, Japan.

History
In the next phase of expansion, the track was further extended, with Iizuka being opened as the new southern terminus on 3 July 1893. On 1 October 1897, the Chikuho Kogyo Railway, now renamed the Chikuho Railway, merged with the Kyushu Railway. Iizuka became a through-station on 1 December 1901 when the Kyushu Railway extended the track to Nagao (now . After the Kyushu Railway was nationalized on 1 July 1907, Japanese Government Railways (JGR) took over control of the station. On 12 October 1909, the station became part of the Chikuho Main Line. With the privatization of Japanese National Railways (JNR), the successor of JGR, on 1 April 1987, control of the station passed to JR Kyushu.

Passenger statistics
In fiscal 2016, the station was used by an average of 1,134 passengers daily (boarding passengers only), and it ranked 151st among the busiest stations of JR Kyushu.

References

External links
 

Railway stations in Japan opened in 1893
Railway stations in Fukuoka Prefecture
Iizuka, Fukuoka